"Half the Man" is a song co-written and recorded by American country music singer Clint Black.  It was released in May 1994 as the fifth and last single from his album No Time to Kill.  Before its release, the song served as the b-side to "A Good Run of Bad Luck." The song peaked at number 4 on the U.S. Billboard Hot Country Singles & Tracks chart and at number 5 on the Canadian RPM Country Tracks chart.  It was written by Black and Hayden Nicholas.

Chart positions
"Half the Man" debuted at number 65 on the U.S. Billboard Hot Country Singles & Tracks for the week of June 11, 1994.

Year-end charts

References

1994 singles
1993 songs
Clint Black songs
Songs written by Clint Black
Songs written by Hayden Nicholas
Song recordings produced by James Stroud
RCA Records singles